Biflaviolin synthase (CYP158A2, CYP 158A2, cytochrome P450 158A2) is an enzyme with systematic name flaviolin,NADPH:oxygen oxidoreductase. This enzyme catalyses the following chemical reaction

 (1) 2 flaviolin + NADPH + H+ + O2  3,3'-biflaviolin + NADP+ + 2 H2O
 (2) 2 flaviolin + NADPH + H+ + O2  3,8'-biflaviolin + NADP+ + 2 H2O

This cytochrome P450 enzyme, from the soil-dwelling bacterium Streptomyces coelicolor A3(2), catalyses a phenol oxidation C-C coupling reaction.

References

External links 
 

EC 1.14.21